Plestiodon lynxe, also known commonly as the oak forest skink, is a species of lizard in the family Scincidae. The species is endemic to Mexico. There are three recognized subspecies.

Habitat

Diet
P. bellii preys upon insects and other arthropods.

Reproduction
P. lynxe is viviparous. Maximum recorded litter size is five neonates.

Subspecies
Three subspecies are recognized as being valid, including the nominotypical subspecies.
Plestiodon lynxe bellii 
Plestiodon lynxe furcirostris 
Plestiodon lynxe lynxe 

Nota bene: A trinomial authority in parentheses indicates that the subspecies was originally described in a genus other than Plestiodon.

Etymology
The subspecific name, bellii, is in honor of English zoologist Thomas Bell.

References

Further reading
Boulenger GA (1887). Catalogue of the Lizards in the British Museum (Natural History). Second Edition. Volume III. ... Scincidæ .... London: Trustees of the British Museum (Natural History). (Taylor and Francis, printers). xii + 575 pp. + Plates I–XL. (Eumeces lynxe, p. 380).
Hartweg N (1931). "Apparent ovoviviparity in the Mexican skink Eumeces lynxae [sic] Wiegmann". Copeia 1931 (2): 60.
Webb RG (1968). "The Mexican skink Eumeces lynxe (Squamata, Scincidae)". Publications of the Museum, Michigan State University, Biological Series 4 (1): 1–28.

lynxe
Reptiles of Mexico
Reptiles described in 1834
Taxa named by Arend Friedrich August Wiegmann